Wèi Xiāngzǐ ( 4th Century BCE) was a ruler of Wei, a vassal of Jin during the Warring States period (475–221 BCE) of Chinese history.

Zhou dynasty people
Monarchs of Wei (state)